Simas is a Lithuanian masculine given name. It is often a diminutive of the name Simonas. People with the name Simas include:
Simas Buterlevičius (born 1989), Lithuanian basketball player 
Simas Galdikas (born 1987), Lithuanian basketball player
Simas Jasaitis (born 1982), Lithuanian basketball player
Simas Skinderis (born 1981), Lithuanian footballer

References

Lithuanian masculine given names